The Elnu Abenaki Tribe is a state-recognized tribe in Vermont, who claim descent from Abenaki people. 

They are not federally recognized as a Native American tribe. Vermont has no federally recognized tribes.

Leadership 

Roger Longtoe Sheehan served as chief since at least 2016.

State recognition 
Vermont recognized the Elnu Abenaki Tribe as a state-recognized tribe in 2011. The other state-recognized tribes in Vermont are the Nulhegan Band of the Coosuk Abenaki Nation, Koasek Abenaki Tribe, and the Mississquoi Abenaki Tribe.

Nonprofit organization 
In 2020, the group created 'Elnu Abenaki Incorporated, a 501(c)(3) nonprofit organization, based in Brattleboro, Vermont. Their registered agent is Rich Holshuh.

Heritage 
The Elnu Abenaki Tribe are the smallest of Vermont's four state-recognized tribes. They had 60 members in 2016.

St. Mary's University associate professor Darryl Leroux's genealogical and historical research found that the  members of this and the other three state-recognized tribes in Vermont were composed primarily of "French descendants who have used long-ago ancestry in New France to shift into an 'Abenaki' identity."

The State of Vermont reported in 2002 that the Abenaki people migrated north to Quebec at the end of the 17th century.

Activities 
They participate in Abenaki Heritage Weekend, held at the Lake Champlain Maritime Museum in Vergennes, Vermont.

Property tax 
Vermont H.556, "An act relating to exempting property owned by Vermont-recognized Native American tribes from property tax," passed on April 20, 2022.

Notes

References

External links
 
 Vermont Commission on Native American Affairs

Abenaki heritage groups
Cultural organizations based in Vermont
French American
Native American tribes in Vermont
Non-profit organizations based in Vermont
State-recognized tribes in the United States